Long intergenic non-protein coding RNA 1590 is a protein that in humans is encoded by the LINC01590 gene.

References

Further reading